Carmovirus was a genus of viruses. The genus was split in 2015 into three genera, each retaining -carmovirus as part of their name:

 Alphacarmovirus
 Betacarmovirus
 Gammacarmovirus

These genera are in the same family, Tombusviridae, as the original genus and are more specifically in the subfamily Procedovirinae. The following species were assigned to Carmovirus and are, as of 2020, placed within Procedovirinae but not assigned to a genus:

 Ahlum waterborne virus
 Bean mild mosaic virus
 Cucumber soil-borne virus
 Weddel waterborne virus

References

Obsolete virus taxa